Dryophytes is a genus of Ameroasian tree frogs in the family Hylidae. They are found mostly in North America, but the genus also includes three species found in eastern Asia.

Description 
Dryophytes consists of small tree-dwelling frogs, usually green or gray in color. They have digits ending with expanded discs to help them sick to surfaces like trees.

Habitat 
These tree frogs are found in wetlands throughout their range, as well as in temperate forests both on the ground and in trees.

Taxonomy 
The genus was first described by Fitzinger in 1843. Later it was placed into the genus Hyla, the true tree frogs, by Boulenger in 1882. Fouquette and Dubois 2014, treated Dryophytes as a subgenus of Hyla. Dryophytes was finally resurrected as an independent genus by Duellman et al. in 2016.

Only geographical, rather than morphological, differences separates Dryophytes from the genus Hyla. Hyla is found only in the Old World, whereas Dryophytes is distributed in the New World. Most members occur in North America, but four species are found in eastern temperate Asia; D. immaculata, D. japonica, D. flaviventris and D. suweonensis.

Species 
The genus Dryophytes contains 20 species.

References 

 
Amphibian genera
Hylinae
Amphibians of Asia
Amphibians of Central America
Amphibians of North America
Taxa named by Leopold Fitzinger